The Communauté de communes de Varenne et Scie is a former intercommunality in the Seine-Maritime département of the Normandy region of north-western France. It was created on January 1, 2002. It was merged into the new Communauté de communes Terroir de Caux in January 2017.

Participants 
The Communauté de communes comprised the following 22 communes:

Anneville-sur-Scie
Belmesnil
Le Bois-Robert
Bertreville-Saint-Ouen
Le Catelier
Les Cent-Acres
La Chapelle-du-Bourgay
La Chaussée
Criquetot-sur-Longueville
Crosville-sur-Scie
Dénestanville
Lintot-les-Bois
Longueville-sur-Scie
Manéhouville
Muchedent
Notre-Dame-du-Parc
Saint-Crespin
Saint-Germain-d'Étables
Saint-Honoré
Sainte-Foy
Torcy-le-Grand
Torcy-le-Petit

See also
Communes of the Seine-Maritime department

References 

Varenne et Scie